Jane Clarke (born 10 February 1961) is an Irish poet. She is the author of two poetry collections and an illustrated poetry booklet. The Irish novelist Anne Enright has praised her poems for their "clean, hard-earned simplicity and a lovely sense of line."

Personal life 
Jane Clarke grew up on a farm in Fuerty, Co. Roscommon. She attended Fuerty National School and the Convent of Mercy, Roscommon. She won an international scholarship to the Lester B. Pearson United World College of the Pacific in Victoria, British Columbia, where she studied for an International Baccalaureate for two years. She holds an Honours BA in English and Philosophy from Trinity College Dublin and an MPhil in Writing from the University of South Wales. She also holds a diploma in action research from the University of Bath and a diploma in group analytic psychotherapy from the Institute of Group Analysis, UK. 

Clarke worked in community development, adult education and psychotherapy in Dublin for thirteen years. In 1999 she and her partner Isobel O’Duffy moved to live in Glenmalure, Co. Wicklow. Five years later she began writing poetry and now combines writing with mentoring and creative writing tutoring.

Writing 
Clarke is the author of two poetry collections, The River (Bloodaxe Books, 2015) and When the Tree Falls (Bloodaxe Books, 2019), as well as an illustrated poetry booklet, All the Way Home, written in response to a family archive of First World War photographs and letters (Smith|Doorstop, 2019). 

Much of her work is, in the words of the British poet Carol Rumens, "rooted in the landscape of the west of Ireland and the farming context in which the lives of individual humans are played out asserts its own rhythm and narrative. In honouring this larger context Clarke enlarges her poetic field with an unobtrusive but important ecopoetic dimension."  She has been heralded by the Welsh poet Tony Curtis as "one of the most rewarding poets in these islands".

Awards 
 2010 iYeats International Poetry Competition
 2014 Listowel Writers’ Week Poetry Collection Prize
 2014 Trocaire/Poetry Ireland Poetry Competition
 2016 Hennessy Literary Award for Emerging Poetry
 2016 Listowel Writers’ Week Irish Poem of the Year Award
 2017 Arts Council of Ireland Literature Bursary
 2021 Forward Book of Poetry: Highly Commended

Publications

Poetry collections

Poetry booklet

Editor

Reviews 
 The River
 When the Tree Falls
 All the Way Home

References

External links 
 Official website
 TV interview: Irish Book Awards, Listowel Writers' Week Irish Poem of the Year Award, November 2016
 Radio interview:  Countrywide, RTÉ Radio 1, June 2020

Irish poets
Irish women poets
Alumni of Trinity College Dublin
Alumni of the University of South Wales
Living people
1961 births
Ecopoetry
People from County Wicklow
People from County Roscommon
Alumni of the University of Bath
People educated at a United World College